Natalya Kovshova (Russian: Наталья Ковшова; 26 November 1920 – 14 August 1942) was a Soviet female sniper who fought in World War II.

She fought with her friend Mariya Polivanova who acted as her spotter. Natalya fought bravely throughout the war; she was killed fighting German Wehrmacht forces near Novgorod in August 1942. She was posthumously awarded the title Hero of the Soviet Union, the Soviet Union's highest award for bravery, on 14 February 1943.

Early life

Natalya Kovshova was born on 26 November 1920 in Ufa, modern-day capital of the Republic of Bashkortostan in Russia. Shortly after her birth, her family moved to Moscow. She was educated at a high school in Moscow. After graduating from high school, Kovshova began work at a Moscow research institute while waiting to be accepted into a university of aviation. She met a girl named Mariya Polivanova while in the institute; the two became good friends.

World War II

When the German-Soviet War began in 1941, Kovshova joined a Narodnoe Opolcheniye (self-defence) unit in Moscow with Polivanova at age 21. These self-defence groups were started when German Luftwaffe aircraft began to bomb Russian cities and towns. Kovshova was put in charge of the observation and communication department. She spent many nights in the control tower. After her experience at the self-defence group, Kovshova attended sniper training in the 528th Rifle Regiment. After her training had been completed, she was sent to the front with the 528th Rifle Regiment.

In January 1942, Kovshova and Polivanova, who had joined the same regiment shortly after Kovshova, began fighting the German forces on the Northwestern Front. Both women established themselves as the Regiment's resident snipers. Kovshova was the shooter in the two-women sniper team, and Polivanova acted as the spotter. They both fought in the Battle of Moscow when the 528th Rifle Regiment were sent to help defend Russia's capital. During the battle, Kovshova proved to be an expert sniper, killing many German soldiers. She also dug numerous anti-tank emplacements, machine gun nests, and infantry trenches during the defence. She took the job of training new soldiers how to use the rifles. She also trained the best students to become snipers, teaching them marksmanship early; passing on her shooting  skills. For her actions in the battle of Moscow, Kovshova was awarded the Order of the Red Star.

Kovshova expressed great hatred of the Germans during the war. She was inspired by the Soviet propaganda explaining how the Soviet soldiers were fighting for the liberation of the Motherland. She wrote to her mother in 1942: "You can hear horrible stories from local residents who have been in the hands of the fascist pigs. The women we live with had a guest come to visit said that the Germans shot her brother and four of her friends simply because they went outside after 4pm." Natalya found great delight in killing German soldiers. She wrote to her mother on 7 July 1942: "My dearest Mama!" "Please don't be angry that I didn't write to you about being wounded. But I didn't want to worry you for no reason, since nothing serious happened..." "I've been back with my unit 2nd June 1942. Now Mashenka [Mariya] and I are working with the young snipers. Their statistics are looking good. In the last two weeks of June our students took down 3 Fritzes. Not bad!"... "A few days ago five of us went on reconnaissance without saying anything to the company commander. We were right under the German's very noses and they had no clue!"

On 14 August 1942, Kovshova's regiment was committed to the fighting near the village of Sutoki-Byakovo in the Novgorod Oblast. The machine gunners and snipers resisted the German offensive in trenches. The Soviet soldiers were killed one after another, until only Kovshova and Polivanova remained, both wounded. As being captured was not an option, Kovshova decided to pull the pin of her grenade, and wait to blow the German soldiers up when they reached the trench. When the Germans finally reached the trench, Kovshova detonated the grenades, killing herself, Polivanova and many German soldiers. She was posthumously awarded the Hero of the Soviet Union shortly after, in recognition of her sacrifice. It is estimated that Kovshova and Polivanova together killed over 300 German soldiers.

A Soviet fishing factory trawler was christened Natalya Kovshova in the 1960s.

See also

 List of female Heroes of the Soviet Union
 List of last stands
 Mariya Polivanova
 Valeriya Gnarovskaya

References

Soviet military personnel killed in World War II
Women in the Russian and Soviet military
Heroes of the Soviet Union
Soviet military snipers
1920 births
1942 deaths
Military personnel from Ufa